The Bear River is a  river in the Sierra Nevada in California. It is a tributary of the Mokelumne River. The river and its watershed are entirely in El Dorado National Forest.

The river begins as two forks several miles south of Kirkwood. The forks travel roughly southwest and merge just before the river enters Upper Bear River Reservoir. Immediately downstream of the reservoir is Lower Bear River Reservoir. Below the reservoir, the river continues southwest until it meets the Mokelumne River. The reservoirs on the Bear River are owned by Pacific Gas and Electric Company as part of the Mokelumne Hydroelectric Project.

References

East Bay Municipal Utility District

Mokelumne River
Rivers of the Sierra Nevada (United States)
Rivers of Amador County, California
Eldorado National Forest
Pacific Gas and Electric Company
Rivers of Northern California
Rivers of the Sierra Nevada in California